Sussex II State Prison is a prison of the Virginia Department of Corrections located in unincorporated Sussex County, Virginia, near Waverly. It is adjacent to Sussex I State Prison, which lies to its southeast, just across Mussellwhite Drive.

One of only four state prisons, the facility has a maximum capacity of 1,352 offenders. It is a security level 4 prison. The prison offers vocational and educational programs, as well as re-entry to offenders who qualify. In terms of building structure, the facility is identical to Sussex I State Prison.

In May 2004, two inmates attempted to escape the prison in a truck but were apprehended.

References

Buildings and structures in Sussex County, Virginia
Prisons in Virginia
1998 establishments in Virginia